For the Love of Money is the fourth album by the industrial hip hop group Tackhead, released on January 10, 2014 by Dude Records. It marks their first full-length release of studio material since Strange Things, released twenty-four years prior. It comprises covers of musical acts that have proven influential to the group over the years, along with an extended cut of their original song "Stealing" from Friendly as a Hand Grenade.

Track listing

Personnel 

Tackhead
Bernard Fowler – lead vocals, backing vocals, co-producer
Keith LeBlanc – drums, percussion, drum machine, producer, mixing
Skip McDonald – guitar, keyboards, vocals, backing vocals, co-producer
Adrian Sherwood – mixing, co-producer
Doug Wimbish – bass guitar, keyboards, backing vocals, co-producer

Technical personnel
Dubvisionist – mixing
Umberto Echo – mixing
Martin Fekl – mixing, co-producer
Arn Schlürmann – mixing, co-producer

Release history

References

External links 
 

2014 albums
Albums produced by Keith LeBlanc
Albums produced by Adrian Sherwood
Tackhead albums
Covers albums